Prümzurlay is a municipality in the district of Bitburg-Prüm, in Rhineland-Palatinate, western Germany.

In 1960, the first bungalow holiday village in Germany was built near the ruins of the  Prümerburg and is now named after the castle.

Sights 
 Devil's Gorge

References

External links
TV portrait of Prümzurlay broadcast by Südwestrundfunk 

Bitburg-Prüm